Athena, often given the epithet Pallas, is an ancient Greek goddess of wisdom.

Pallas Athena may also refer to:
 Advanced Telescope for High Energy Astrophysics (ATHENA), a planned space telescope
 Pallas Athena (song),  song by David Bowie from the 1993 album Black Tie White Noise
 SS Flandre (1951), a former ship of the French Line rechristened the Pallas Athena as its final name

See also

 Athena (disambiguation)
 Pallas (disambiguation)